Gino Rossi (May 29, 1908 – 1987) was an Italian boxer who competed in the Olympic games in 1932. He was born in Piacenza. He won the silver medal in the light heavyweight competition in Los Angeles, losing to David Carstens of South Africa in the gold-medal match.

1932 Olympic results
 Quarterfinal:  defeated Nikolaos Mastoridis (Greece) on points
 Semifinal: defeated William Murphy (Ireland) by walkover
 Final:  lost to David Carstens (South Africa) on points (was awarded silver medal)

References

External links
Report on Italian Olympic boxers 

1908 births
1987 deaths
Sportspeople from Piacenza
Light-heavyweight boxers
Boxers at the 1932 Summer Olympics
Olympic boxers of Italy
Olympic silver medalists for Italy
Olympic medalists in boxing
Medalists at the 1932 Summer Olympics
Italian male boxers